Vamban is a 1987 Indian Malayalam film, directed by Hassan. The film stars Ratheesh, Rohini, Kalaranjini and Anuradha in the lead roles. The film has musical score by A. T. Ummer.This film got in to controversy when the villain misbehaved with Rohini during rape scene shooting.

Cast
Ratheesh as Ravi
Rohini as Viji
Kalaranjini as Kala
Ranipadmini as Dominic's daughter 
T. G. Ravi as Dominic
Sathaar as Peter
Sukumaran as MD Chandrasekharan Nair
Kuthiravattom Pappu as Sankaran
Anju as child artist
Ahalya as Anju
Sankaradi as Rajan Muthalali 
Bheeman Raghu as Police officer

Soundtrack
The music was composed by A. T. Ummer and the lyrics were written by K. G. Menon and Arifa Hassan.

References

External links
 

1987 films
1980s Malayalam-language films